Hsieh Tung-min (25 January 1908 – 9 April 2001) was the ninth Governor of Taiwan Province (1972–1978), the sixth and first local Taiwanese Vice President of the Republic of China (1978–1984) under president Chiang Ching-kuo.

Family and early life
Hsieh was born to an ordinary farming family in Taichū Prefecture, Japanese Taiwan. He was educated at Taichung County Taichung Middle School, graduating in 1922. He went to Shanghai for tertiary education and later graduated from Sun Yat-sen University in Guangzhou. Afterwards, he became a columnist in Hong Kong and Guangzhou.

Road into politics
Hsieh joined the Kuomintang in 1930.

In 1942, Hsieh was invited to plan the Taiwan office of Kuomintang. From 1943 to 1945, he worked for anti-Japan activities in Guangdong.

In 1945, after 20 and half years in the mainland, he went back to Taiwan as a KMT official. He became the first magistrate of Kaohsiung County in 1948, later Vice-director of Education of Taiwan Province, chancellor of National Taiwan Normal University, Secretary of Taiwan Province and Chief Councillor of Taiwan Provincial Council.

Governor of Taiwan Province
Hsieh became the ninth governor of Taiwan Province in 1972. On 10 October 1976, he received a parcel bomb from Wang Sing-nan, at the time a Taiwanese businessman based in the United States. The bomb injured Hsieh's left hand. To prevent sepsis, the hospital decided to amputate his left hand and gave him an prosthetic hand.

Later political career and death
Hsieh became vice president on 20 May 1978. He was replaced by another Taiwanese, Lee Teng-hui, on 20 May 1984. Afterwards Hsieh became senior secretary of the Presidential Office. Hsieh sought treatment from Taipei Veterans General Hospital for a heart attack on 23 January 2001. He later returned to his home in Taipei and died on 9 April 2001. His funeral was held on 22 April 2001.

Contributions to education in Taiwan
On 26 March 1958, Hsieh set up the first private university, the Shih Chien University in Kaohsiung. During his governorship and vice-presidency, he worked hard on educational affairs and success to make all people of the new generations of Taiwan to be educated.

References

1908 births
2001 deaths
Vice presidents of the Republic of China on Taiwan
Politicians of the Republic of China on Taiwan from Changhua County
Politicians with disabilities
Senior Advisors to President Lee Teng-hui
Senior Advisors to President Chiang Ching-kuo
National Sun Yat-sen University alumni
Kuomintang politicians in Taiwan
20th-century Taiwanese educators
Chairpersons of the Taiwan Provincial Government
Magistrates of Kaohsiung County
Presidents of universities and colleges in Taiwan
Academic staff of Shih Chien University
Academic staff of the National Taiwan Normal University